Hesar-e Hajjilar (also Romanized as Ḩeşār-e Ḩājjīlār and Ḩeşār-e Ḩājjīlar) is a village in Bakeshluchay Rural District, in the Central District of Urmia County, West Azerbaijan Province, Iran. At the 2006 census, its population was 447, in 134 families.

References 

Populated places in Urmia County